Crambixon is a genus of moths of the family Crambidae. It contains only one species, Crambixon zarathustra, which is found in Afghanistan.

References

Crambinae
Crambidae genera
Taxa named by Stanisław Błeszyński
Monotypic moth genera